Sarah Bear Elizabeth Wishnevsky (born September 22, 1971) is an American author who works primarily in speculative fiction genres, writing under the name Elizabeth Bear. She won the 2005 John W. Campbell Award for Best New Writer, the 2008 Hugo Award for Best Short Story for "Tideline", and the 2009 Hugo Award for Best Novelette for "Shoggoths in Bloom". She is one of a small number of writers who have gone on to win multiple Hugo Awards for fiction after winning the John W. Campbell Award for Best New Writer (the others include C. J. Cherryh, Orson Scott Card, Spider Robinson, Ted Chiang and Mary Robinette Kowal).

Life and career

Born in Hartford, Connecticut, Bear studied English and anthropology at the University of Connecticut but did not graduate. She worked as a technical writer, stable hand, reporter and held various office jobs. She sold a few stories in the 1990s and began writing seriously in 2001.

Bear's first novel, Hammered, was published in January 2005 and was followed by Scardown in July and Worldwired in November of the same year. The trilogy features Canadian Master Warrant Officer Jenny Casey, who is also the main character in the short story "Gone to Flowers". Hammered won the Locus Award for Best First Novel in 2006.

The Chains That You Refuse, a collection of her short fiction, was published May 2006 by Night Shade Books. Blood and Iron, the first book in the fantasy series entitled "The Promethean Age", debuted June 27, 2006. She is also a coauthor of the ongoing Shadow Unit website/pseudo-TV series.

In 2008, she donated her archive to the department of Rare Books and Special Collections at Northern Illinois University.

She is an instructor at the Viable Paradise writer's workshop and has taught at Clarion West Writers Workshop.

The opening quote in Criminal Minds episode "Lauren" (6.18) was a direct quote of the second and third lines of Bear's book Seven for a Secret: "The secret to lying is to believe with all your heart. That goes for lying to yourself even more than lying to another."

She is one of the regular panelists on podcast SF Squeecast, which won the 2012 and 2013 Hugo Awards for "Best Fancast".

Bear married novelist Scott Lynch in October 2016.

In 2021, Bear announced that she had been diagnosed with early-stage breast cancer.

Published works

Novels

The Jenny Casey trilogy
 Hammered (January 2005, Bantam Spectra)
 Scardown (July 2005, Bantam Spectra)
 Worldwired (November 2005, Bantam Spectra)

The Promethean Age
 Blood and Iron (June 2006, ROC)
 Whiskey and Water (July 2007, ROC)
 The Stratford Man:
 Volume I: Ink and Steel (July 2008, ROC)
 Volume II: Hell and Earth (August 2008, ROC)
 One Eyed Jack (November 2013, Prime Books)

Jacob's Ladder trilogy
 Dust (December 2007, Spectra)
 Chill (February 2010, Spectra)
 Grail (February 2011, Spectra)

The Edda of Burdens
 All the Windwracked Stars (November 2008, Tor)
 By the Mountain Bound (November 2009, Tor)
 The Sea thy Mistress (February 2011, Tor)

The Iskryne series
 A Companion to Wolves, co-written with Sarah Monette (October 2007, Tor)
 The Tempering of Men, co-written with Sarah Monette (August 2011, Tor)
 An Apprentice to Elves, co-written with Sarah Monette (June 25, 2015, Tor)

New Amsterdam series
 New Amsterdam (May 2007, Subterranean Press)
 Seven for a Secret (novella; March 2009, Subterranean Press)
 The White City (novella; 2011, Subterranean Press)
 Ad Eternum (novella; February 2012, Subterranean Press)
 Garrett Investigates (November 2012, Subterranean Press)

Eternal Sky Trilogy
 Range of Ghosts (March 2012, Tor Books)
 Shattered Pillars (2013, Tor Books)
 Steles of the Sky (2014, Tor Books)

The Lotus Kingdoms 
 The Stone in the Skull (2017, Tor Books)
The Red-Stained Wings (2019, Tor Books)
The Origin of Storms (2022, Tor Books)

Other novels
 Carnival (November 2006, Bantam Spectra)
 Undertow (August 2007, Bantam Spectra)
 Bone and Jewel Creatures (novella) (2010, Subterranean Press)

Karen Memory
 Karen Memory (2015, Tor-Forge)
 Stone Mad (2018, Tor-Forge)

White Space
 Ancestral Night (2018, Gallery / Saga Press)
 Machine (2020, Gallery / Saga Press)

Short story collections
 The Chains That You Refuse (May 2006, Night Shade Books)
 Shoggoths in Bloom (October 2012, Prime Books)

Short fiction
 "Okay, Glory" in Twelve Tomorrows (2018, MIT Press).
 "No Decent Patrimony" in Mash Up: Stories Inspired by Famous First Lines, June 2016
 "The Heart's Filthy Lesson" in Old Venus (2015, Bantam Books).
 "This Chance Planet" at Tor.com, October, 2014.
"In the House of Aryaman, a Lonely Signal Burns" in Asimov's Science Fiction, January 2012. Reprinted in The Year's Best Science Fiction: Thirtieth Annual Collection. Copy online
 "King Pole, Gallows Pole, Bottle Tree" in Naked City: New Tales of Urban Fantasy (2010, St. Martin's Press).
 "The Horrid Glory of Its Wings" at Tor.com, December 2009.
 "Swell" in Eclipse Three (2009, Night Shade Books).
 "Mongoose" (with Sarah Monette) in Lovecraft Unbound (2009, Dark Horse Comics. Reprinted in The Year's Best Science Fiction: Twenty-Seventh Annual Collection)
 "The Red in the Sky Is Our Blood" in METAtropolis (2009, Subterranean Press).
 "Snow Dragons" in Subterranean Magazine, Summer 2009.
 "Two Dreams on a Train" reprinted in Rewired: The Post-Cyberpunk Anthology, 2009.
 "Inelastic Collisions" in Inferno (2009, Tor Books).
 "The Girl Who Sang Rose Madder" at Tor.com, September 2008.
 "Boojum" (with Sarah Monette) in Fast Ships, Black Sails (2008, Night Shade Books).
 "Shoggoths in Bloom" in Asimov's Science Fiction, March 2008.
 "Sonny Liston Takes the Fall" in The Del Rey Book of Science Fiction and Fantasy (2008, Del Rey).
 "Your Collar" in Subterranean Magazine, 2008.
 "Annie Webber" in Nature, 2008.
 "Hobnoblin Blues" in Realms of Fantasy, February 2008.
 "The Ladies" in Coyote Wild, December 2007.
 "Black Is the Color" in Subterranean Magazine, Summer 2007.
 "Matte" in Fictitious Force, 2007.
 "The Rest of Your Life in a Day" in Jim Baen's Universe, October 2007.
 "Cryptic Coloration" in Jim Baen's Universe, June 2007.
 "Tideline" in Asimov's Science Fiction, June 2007.
 "Limerant" in Subterranean Magazine #6 (2007, Subterranean Press)
 "Abjure the Realm" in Coyote Wild, Winter 2007.
 "War Stories" in Jim Baen's Universe, February 2007.
 "Something Dreaming Game" in Fast Forward 1 (2007, Prometheus Books)
 "Orm the Beautiful" in Clarkesworld Magazine, January 2007.
 "Love Among the Talus" in Strange Horizons, December 11, 2006.
 "Lucifugous" in Subterranean Magazine #5 (2006, Subterranean Press).
 "Follow Me Light" reprinted in Best New Paranormal Romance (November 2006) and Year's Best Fantasy and Horror (September 2006)
 "Sounding" in Strange Horizons, September 18, 2006.
 "Two Dreams on Trains" reprinted in Year's Best Science Fiction #23 (July 2006).
 "Wax" reprinted in Fantasy: The Best of the Year 2006 edition (June 2006)
 "Ile of Dogges" (with Sarah Monette) in Aeon 7, 2006
 "Dos Sueños con Trenes" ["Two Dreams on Trains", Spanish-language version] in Cuasar #42, Marzo 2006
 "The Inevitable Heat Death of the Universe" in Subterranean Magazine #4 (2006, Subterranean Press)
 "The Cold Blacksmith" in Jim Baen's Universe, June 2006
 "Gone to Flowers" (2006) in Eidolon I (ed. Jonathan Strahan, Jeremy G. Byrne)
 "Los Empujadores Furioso" On Spec, Winter 2006
 "Wane" in Interzone #203 Mar/Apr 2006
 "Wax" in Interzone #201 Nov/Dec 2005
 "Long Cold Day" in Sci Fiction, September 21, 2005
 "House of the Rising Sun" in The Third Alternative #42, Summer 2005
 "And the Deep Blue Sea" in Sci Fiction, May 4, 2005
 "One-Eyed Jack and the Suicide King" in Lenox Avenue, March–April 2005
 "Botticelli" at The Agony Column, February 2005
 "Two Dreams on Trains" in Strange Horizons, January 3, 2005
 "Follow Me Light" in Sci Fiction, January 12, 2005
 "When You Visit the Magoebaskloof Hotel, Be Certain Not to Miss the Samango Monkeys" in Interzone 195, Nov/Dec 2004
 "Seven Dragons Mountains" in All-Star Zeppelin Adventure Stories, Wheatland Press, October 2004 (YBF&H Honorable Mention)
 "Sleeping Dogs Lie" in Flytrap, November 2004
 "Ice (Lod)" (Polish-language version) in Nowa Fantastyka #7 (Summer 2004)
 "Old Leatherwings" in Lenox Avenue, July 2004
 "This Tragic Glass" in Sci Fiction, April 7, 2004 (YBSF Honorable Mention, James Tiptree, Jr. Award long list)
 "The Chains That You Refuse" in Chiaroscuro, April 2004
 "Speak!" in On Spec, Winter 2003
 "Tiger! Tiger!" in the anthology Shadows Over Baker Street (Del Rey, September 2003)
 "Ice" in the April 2003 issue of Ideomancer
 "The Dying of the Light" (with Amber van Dyk) in the April 2003 issue of the Fortean Bureau (YBF&H Honorable Mention)
 An excerpt from "Hammered" appeared in the Summer 2003 issue of Harpur Palate
 "The Company of Four" in Scheherazade issue #20
 "The Devil You Don't" in Amberzine 11

Poetry
 "Li Bai Drowns While Embracing the Moon" in Not One of Us, Issue 42.
 "Seven Steeds" in Lone Star Stories, Issue 29, Oct. 2008.
 "e.e. 'doc' cummings" in The Magazine of Fantasy & Science Fiction, March 2003.

Essays
 "We'll Make Great Pets" in Chicks Dig Time Lords (2010, Mad Norwegian Press)

Reception
Annalee Newitz of io9 wrote that Bear "is famous for combining high-octane military/spy tales with eccentric and subversive subplots".

Awards
 2005 John W. Campbell Award for Best New Writer
 2006 Locus Award for Best First Novel for Hammered/Scardown/Worldwired
 2008 Theodore Sturgeon Memorial Award for Best Short Science Fiction for "Tideline"
 2008 Hugo Award for Best Short Story for "Tideline"
 2009 Hugo Award for Best Novelette for "Shoggoths in Bloom"
 2009 Gaylactic Spectrum Award for Best Novel for The Stratford Man (Ink and Steel and Hell and Earth)
 2012 Audie Award for Best Original Work for "Metatropolis: Cascadia"
 2012 Hugo Award for Best Fancast for SF Squeecast
 2013 Hugo Award for Best Fancast for SF Squeecast
 2013 Locus Award for Best Collection for Shoggoths in Bloom
 2021 Neffy Award for Best Novel (tie) for Machine

References

External links

 
 Interview at Clarkesworld Magazine, May 2010
 Interview at SFRevu.com, April 2019
 
 Elizabeth Bear at The Encyclopedia of Science Fiction
 Elizabeth Bear stories available free online

1971 births
21st-century American novelists
21st-century American short story writers
21st-century American women writers
American science fiction writers
American women novelists
American women short story writers
Hugo Award-winning writers
John W. Campbell Award for Best New Writer winners
American LGBT novelists
Living people
Novelists from Connecticut
University of Connecticut alumni
Women science fiction and fantasy writers
Writers from Hartford, Connecticut